Christopher Pennock (June 7, 1943 – February 12, 2021) was an American actor.

He began acting on stage after graduating from the American Academy of Dramatic Arts.

Pennock had been active for over 40 years starring on and off-Broadway, in repertory and experimental theater, and in many films and television shows. He was perhaps best known for his run on the television show Dark Shadows in the early 1970s, playing multiple roles in various timelines. He also appeared in 1971 film spinoff Night of Dark Shadows. He appeared in over 50 guest-starring roles on television from Melrose Place to General Hospital, as well as numerous films, among them James Ivory's Savages (1972) and Graeme Clifford's Frances (1982) (starring Jessica Lange and Sam Shepard). He was a lifetime member of the Actors Studio.

Pennock wrote and illustrated a continuing comic-book series about his experiences on the set of Dark Shadows. He lived with his wife in Idyllwild, California. He was known for his devotion to the Dzogchen school of Tibetan Buddhism.

Pennock was married to the former Lynn Dunn, and they had a daughter. He died in California on February 12, 2021, at the age of 77.

References

External links

1944 births
2021 deaths
20th-century American male actors
American male film actors
Place of death missing
American male stage actors
American male television actors
People from Jackson Hole, Wyoming
Male actors from Wyoming